John Hećimović (born March 31, 1984) is a Canadian-born Croatian former professional ice hockey player. He most notably played in the Erste Bank Eishockey Liga with KHL Medveščak and Dornbirner EC. Hećimović's ancestors hail from Perušić in Lika.

Playing career
Hećimović was selected in the 9th round (264th overall) of the 2003 NHL Entry Draft by the Florida Panthers. John was drafted from Major Junior Sarnia Sting of the Ontario Hockey League. In his fifth season with the Sting (2004–05) he was traded to the Mississauga IceDogs to finish his junior career.

In his career Hećimović has played in the 2nd Austrian, German, and Swiss league. In the 2008–09 season he was the leading scorer of the Dutch Championship, helping HYS The Hague win the championship. On June 3, 2009, Hećimović signed as a free agent with Croatian team, KHL Medveščak, joining the prestigious EBEL league.  In the 2009–10 season, his first with the Bears, John scored 20 goals in 49 regular season games. At the Salata 2010 Winter Classic, Hećimović became the first scorer, and top scorer with two goals, within EBEL history to score at Salata Ice Rink in the defeat against Villach 2-3. On April 20, 2010, he was re-signed to a two-year contract as Medveščak finished seventh in the league.

Hećimović moved onto a tryout at HDD Olimpija Ljubljana. In October 2011 he signed a one-month deal with Anyang Halla.

On December 8, 2011, Hećimović was signed by the Nippon Paper Cranes of the Asia League for the remainder of the 2011–12 season. After finishing the season with the Nippon Paper Cranes, Hećimović returned to the EBEL for one final season with Dornbirner EC.

In 2013, Hećimović played for the Croatian national team at the IIHF World Championship Division II.

Career statistics

Regular season and playoffs

International

References

External links 

John Hecimovic's profile at KHL Medveščak
John Hecimovic's profile at Croatian hockeyportal

1984 births
Living people
HL Anyang players
Canadian ice hockey right wingers
Canadian people of Croatian descent
Dornbirn Bulldogs players
Florida Panthers draft picks
KHL Medveščak Zagreb players
Nippon Paper Cranes players
Mississauga IceDogs players
Pensacola Ice Pilots players
People from Cambridge, Ontario
Sarnia Sting players
South Carolina Stingrays players
Straubing Tigers players
Canadian expatriate ice hockey players in Austria
Canadian expatriate ice hockey players in Croatia
Canadian expatriate ice hockey players in Germany